Mandela Money is the second studio album by South African American hip hop recording artist and record producer Da L.E.S, released on July 4, 2014. It is his first album to be released by his record company Fresh 2 Def Productions, along with a distribution deal through Sony Music Entertainment Africa.

Background 
Recording sessions for the album began after the release of the commercially successful single, titled "Heaven" which features guest verses from fellow South African hip hop recording artists AKA and Maggz. Da L.E.S used the R1 million cash prize that he won from Tropika in 2013 to build his own record and publishing company Fresh 2 Def Productions. Da L.E.S stated that the album was inspired by former South African President Nelson Mandela, citing his inspiration to "Reach higher heights in order to have my face on money one day”. He made the album to encourage young Africans to strive for success.

Promotion 
Da L.E.S embarked on a Mandela Money tour in South Africa, to promote the release of his sophomore studio album, his first solo release in over 5 years since Fresh 2 Def in 2008.

Track listing

References 

2014 albums
Da L.E.S albums